is a 2005 Japanese drama film directed by Mitsuo Kurotsuchi. It was entered into the 28th Moscow International Film Festival.

Cast
 Ichikawa Somegorō VII as Maki
 Yoshino Kimura as Fuku
 Koji Imada as Shimazaki Yonosuke
 Ryo Fukawa as Kowada Ippei
 Mieko Harada as Tose
 Ken Ogata as Maki Sukezaemon
 Takuya Ishida
 Aimi Satsukawa as Fuku, childhood
 Masahiro Hisano
 Yukihiro Iwabuchi
 Ryō Tamura

References

External links
 

2005 films
2005 drama films
Japanese drama films
2000s Japanese-language films
Films scored by Taro Iwashiro
2000s Japanese films